Ward 15 Don Valley West is a municipal electoral division in Toronto, Ontario that has been represented in the Toronto City Council since the 2018 municipal election. It was last contested in 2018, with Jaye Robinson elected as the councillor for the 2018–2022 term.

History 
The ward was created in 2018 when the provincial government aligned Toronto's then-44 municipal wards with the 25 corresponding provincial and federal ridings. The current ward is made up of parts of the former Ward 22 St Paul's, the former Ward 25 Don Valley West and southwest portion of the former Ward 26 Don Valley West.

2018 municipal election 
Ward 15 was first contested during the 2018 municipal election, with candidates including Ward 25 incumbent Jaye Robinson and Ward 26 incumbent Jon Burnside. Robinson was ultimately elected with 49.22 per cent of the vote.

Geography 
Ward 15 is part of the North York Community Council.

Don Valley West's boundaries mirror its federal and provincial counterparts: its west border is Mount Pleasant Road and Yonge Street, its north border is Highway 401, its east border is Leslie Street, the Don River and part of Don Mills Road, and the south border is the Don River and the Beltline Trail.

Councillors

Election results

See also 

 Municipal elections in Canada
 Municipal government of Toronto
 List of Toronto municipal elections

References

External links 

 Councillor's webpage

Toronto city council wards
North York
2018 establishments in Ontario